The Grassen is a mountain of the Urner Alps, located east of the Titlis in Central Switzerland. The summit is the tripoint between the cantons of Berne, Obwalden and Uri.

References

External links
 Grassen on Hikr

Mountains of the Alps
Mountains of Switzerland
Mountains of the canton of Uri
Mountains of the canton of Bern
Mountains of Obwalden
Bern–Uri border
Bern–Obwalden border
Obwalden–Uri border